Alexandru Șoltoianu (24 August 1933 – 13 April 2022) was a Moldovan orientalist, activist and a political prisoner in the former Soviet Union.

Biography 
He graduated at Moscow State Institute of International Relations in 1965 and became a lecturer in Oriental studies at the Moldova State University in Chișinău.

In the 1960s and early 1970s he militated for the union of Moldavian SSR with the Socialist Republic of Romania. Between 1969  and 1971, he was a founder of a clandestine National Patriotic Front of Bessarabia and Northern Bukovina, established by several young intellectuals in Chișinău, totaling over 100 members, vowing to fight for the establishment of a Moldavian Democratic Republic, its secession from the Soviet Union and union with Romania.

On 13 January 1972, following an informative note from Ion Stănescu, the President of the Romanian Council of State Security, to Yuri Andropov, the chief of KGB, Șoltoianu as well as Alexandru Usatiuc-Bulgăr, Valeriu Graur, and Gheorghe Ghimpu were arrested and later sentenced to long prison terms.

Şoltoianu was sentenced in 1972 for his activity as leader of the National Patriotic Front. Gheorghe Ghimpu was incarcerated in the same prison camp.

Șoltoianu was released only in January 1986, and he returned to his apartment in Moscow, where he continued to live even after 1991, when Moldova became independent. Nonetheless, he remained active in Romanian nationalist politics. He also joined Mircea Druc's National Council for Reunification. Șoltoianu died on 13 April 2022.

Legacy 
The Commission for the Study of the Communist Dictatorship in Moldova will study and analyze the 1940-1991 period of the communist regime.

Works 
Alexandru Șoltoianu: O viaţă sacrificată pentru ţară. 212.p.
Alexandru Șoltoianu: Dosar Penal. În: Memoria-Revista gândirii arestate, numărul 16.

References

1933 births
2022 deaths
Romanian people of Moldovan descent
Moldovan independence activists
Moscow State Institute of International Relations alumni
20th-century Moldovan historians
National Patriotic Front (Moldova) politicians
Moldovan anti-communists
Romanian orientalists
Romanian nationalists
Recipients of the Order of the Republic (Moldova)
People from Telenești District